Schwickart the Younger of Sickingen (–1478), also written Schweikart, Schweickart or Swicker, was an imperial knight and, from 1459, held the office of Amtmann (akin to a bailiff) in the  Electoral Palatine Amt of Bretten.

Family 
Schwickart was the son of Schwickart VI of Sickingen (died before 1468) and Elisabeth Landschad of Steinach. He married Anna Spet of Zwiefalten, daughter of Albert Spet of Zwiefalten and Clara of Ehestetten. Their marriage produced a son, Conrad, who was appointed as advocate, or Vogt, of Bretten from 1504 to 1508.

Life 
Schwickart of Sickingen came from an old Kraichgau aristocratic family. His duties as amtmann are recorded in a deed as follows: he is to vouchsafe legal protection for all the townsfolk and inhabitants of the Amt. He is also to provide escorts free of charge for all tradesmen, pilgrims and travellers on the "escort roads" (Geleitstraßen) - part of a law known as the Geleitrecht - and only accept voluntary donations in return. His income was 150 guilders and the use of ten morgens of pasture, a herb garden, wood and right to the "small tithe".

He died on 4 August 1478.

Literature 
 Otto Beuttenmüller: Die Vögte im Oberamt Bretten. In: Brettener Jahrbuch, Vol. 5, 1972/73, pp. 89–96.
 Bernd Breitkopf: Die alten Landkreise und ihre Amtsvorsteher. Die Entstehung der Landkreise und Ämter im heutigen Landkreis Karlsruhe - Biographien der Oberamtmänner und Landräte von 1803 bis 1997, Ubstadt-Weiher 1997, p. 21, .

1478 deaths
House of Sickingen
Imperial Knights
Year of birth missing